Donald Alarie (born 4 July 1945) is a writer from Quebec.

Alarie was born in Montreal to Jean-Paul Alarie and his wife Thérèse (née Raymond). He graduated from University of Montreal in 1971, and worked as a teacher at the Cégep de Joliette from 1971 to 1997. He has written for several publications: Moebius, Liberté, Le Sabord, Combats, Estuaire, Brèves littéraires, XYZ (revue), La poésie au Québec.

Prizes
1978: Prix Gibson
1980: Prix Jean-Béraud-Molson for Jérôme et les mots
1987: Prix littéraire Marcel-Panneton
2006: Prix à la création artistique du Conseil des arts et des lettres du Québec pour la région de Lanaudière

Works

1971: Animages animots : spicilège de l'animateur 
1977: La rétrospection, ou, Vingt-quatre heures dans la vie d'un passant P. Tisseyre, 
1979: Du silence 
1979: La visiteuse 
1980: Jérôme et les mots P. Tisseyre,  
1980: Graphignes 
1983: La Vie d'hôtel en automne Cercle Du Livre De France,  
1986: Un Homme paisible P. Tisseyre,  
1987: Petits formats Ecrits des Forges,  
1990: La Terre comme un dessin inachevé (Poems) Écrits des Forges,  
1990: Au cru du vent Ecrits des forges,  
1992: Comme un lièvre pris au piège 
1993: Parfois même la beauté (Poems) Écrits des Forges,  
1995: Les figurants Tisseyre,  
1997: Ainsi nous allons (Poetry) Écrits des Forges,  
1999: Avec notre fragilité ordinaire (Poetry) Écrits des Forges, 
1999: Tu crois que ça va durer?: roman, XYZ, 
2002: Cinéma urbain (Poetry) Écrits des Forges,  
2004: Au café ou ailleurs XYZ éditeur,  
2006: Au jour le jour XYZ,  
2006: Todo está perdido, todo se vuelve a encontrar/ Tout est perdu, tout est retrouvé
2008: David et les autres, novel, XYZ,  
2010: Thomas est de retour, novel, XYZ,  
2010: Comme on joue du piano, Éditions Trois-Pistoles,  
2010: J'admets que cela est éphémère, poetry, Écrits des Forges
2011: attends ton appel, XYZ éditeur,  
2012: En souvenir d'eux, poetry, Éditions Le Murmure, 
2014: À domicile, poetry, Écrits des Forges, 
2016 Le hasard des rencontres La Pleine Lune,
2017   Puis nous nous sommes perdus de vue, La Pleine Lune
2018   Arpenteur du quotidien, poetry, Écrits des Forges

See also

Canadian literature
Canadian poetry
List of Canadian poets
List of Canadian writers
List of Quebec writers

References

1945 births
20th-century Canadian poets
20th-century Canadian male writers
Canadian male poets
Living people
21st-century Canadian poets
Canadian male short story writers
21st-century Canadian novelists
Canadian poets in French
Canadian novelists in French
Canadian short story writers in French
Writers from Montreal
French Quebecers
20th-century Canadian short story writers
Canadian male novelists
21st-century Canadian short story writers
21st-century Canadian male writers